This is a list of Manipuri films released in 2013.

Each and every movie released in 2013 may not be mentioned due to lack of information. Chow Chow Momo na haobara Shingju Bora na oinambara, Thabaton, Beragee Bomb, Dr. Hemogee Heloi, Tabunungda Akaiba Likli, Tamoyaigee Ebecha and Mounao Thoibi were some of the popular films of the year.

Releases

References

Cinema of Manipur
Lists of 2013 films by country or language
2013 in Indian cinema
Lists of Indian films
Meitei language-related lists
 2013